Four ships of the United States Navy have been named Cherokee, after the Cherokee Native American tribe.

 , was a blockade gunboat during the American Civil War.
 , was a steam yacht built in 1903 and commissioned as a patrol ship in the Atlantic during World War I.
 , was built in 1891 but commissioned as a tug during World War I.
 , was a World War II era tug.

Sources

United States Navy ship names